Dominic Volkmer (born 27 April 1996) is a German professional footballer who plays as a centre-back for Atlas Delmenhorst.

Career
Volkmer started playing in Werder Bremen's youth system. Following stints at SC Borgfeld and SC Weyhe he joined VfB Oldenburg where he made 31 appearances scoring one goal in the Regionalliga Nord.

In summer 2016, Volkmer joined Werder Bremen II in the 3. Liga signing a contract until 2019.

In May 2018, 2. Bundesliga side Jahn Regensburg announced Volkmer would join for the 2018–19 season having agreed a contract until 2020. In January 2019, having made one short appearance for Regensburg in the first half of the season, he returned to the 3. Liga, joining Carl Zeiss Jena on loan until the end of the season.

After a short stay at Regensburg, he returned to Jena on 27 August 2019.

He moved to MSV Duisburg for the 2020–21 season. In the summer of 2022, he left Duisburg.

From October 2022 Volkmer trained with Regionalliga Nord club Atlas Delmenhorst, also playing in two friendly matches. He signed with the club on 31 January 2023.

Career statistics

References

External links

Living people
1996 births
German footballers
Footballers from Bremen
Association football defenders
2. Bundesliga players
3. Liga players
Regionalliga players
VfB Oldenburg players
SV Werder Bremen II players
SSV Jahn Regensburg players
FC Carl Zeiss Jena players
MSV Duisburg players
Atlas Delmenhorst players